Mahatma Gandhi Memorial Hospital is located in Warangal city of the Indian  state of Telangana. It is a 1450-bed hospital which is undertaken by the government of Telangana.

The Health minister of Telangana, ETELA RAJENDER announced that the existing MGM Hospital will be upgraded to a world class teaching hospital under the KNRUHS.
Mgm will be having around 3000 out patients per day. 
The super speciality hospital is in its final stage of construction, with almost all the super specialities.

References

External links

Hospital buildings completed in 1955
Hospital buildings completed in 1964
Hospitals established in 1954
Hospitals in Telangana
Teaching hospitals in India
1954 establishments in India
20th-century architecture in India